Airhawk, also known as Star of the North, is a 1981 Australian television action film directed by David Baker and starring Eric Oldfield and Louise Howitt. It was based on the cartoon strip Air Hawk and the Flying Doctors by John Dixon.

Premise
Outback pilot Jim Hawk investigates the murder of his brother, who had been involved in diamond mining in Queensland. He uncovers a plan to flood the market with diamonds.

Cast
Eric Oldfield as Jim Hawk
Louise Howitt as Janet Grant
Phillip Ross as Bob Fenton
Michael Aitkens as The Cowboy
Elli Maclure as Ellen Boulton
David Robson as Warren Hawk
Robbie McGregor as Hans
Kate Sheil as Wendy
Margaret Christensen as Mum Foster
Lois Ramsey as Dorcas
Myra De Groot as Aunt Ellie
Allan Oberholzer as Carter
Malcolm Cork as Wills
Leo Wockner as Hal Matthews

References

External links

Airhawk at National Film and Sound Archive
Air Hawk at AustLit
Airhawk at Oz Movies

Australian television films
Australian aviation films
1981 television films
1981 films
Films based on Australian comics
Films based on comic strips
Live-action films based on comics
Australian action films
1980s English-language films
Films directed by David Baker